The following list is of playwrights known for writing in Hebrew.

A
Nisim Aloni
Natan Alterman (Poondak Haruchot)
Dan Almagor

G
Leah Goldberg (Baalat Haarmon)

H
Shmuel Hasfari

K
Ephraim Kishon

L
Hanoch Levin

M
Igal Mossinsohn

S
Avraham Shlonsky (Uzt-li-gutz-li)
Yehoshua Sobol

Y
Abraham B. Yehoshua (Layla beMay)

References

 
 
Lists of writers by language
Lists of dramatists and playwrights